Bahramabad (also Romanized as Bahrāmābād; also known as Yegeh Mold, Yengeh Molk, and Yengī Molk) is a village in Hegmataneh Rural District, in the Central District of Hamadan County, Hamadan Province, Iran. At the 2006 census, its population was 220, in 54 families.

References 

Populated places in Hamadan County